Sunny Hill is a South Korean K-pop group.

Sunny Hill, Sunnyhill, Sunny Hills, or other similar variants may refer to:

Music 
 Sunny Hill Festival, a music festival held annually in Kosovo and Albania

Education 
 Sunny Hill School, Quezon City, the Philippines
 Sunny Hill Elementary School, Brownsville, Tennessee
 Sunny Hills High School, Fullerton, California
 SMS Sunny Hill, Kuching, Sarawak, Malaysia

Places 
 Sunny Hill, Derby
 Sunny Hill, Kuching, Sarawak, Malaysia
 Sunny Hill Park, Barnet, London
 Sunny Hill Plantation, Leon County, Florida
 Sunny Hills, Orange County, California
 Sunny Hills, Washington County, Florida
 Sunnyhills, New Zealand

See also
 Bregu i Diellit